AM-1221 is a drug that acts as a potent and selective agonist for the cannabinoid receptor CB2, with a Ki of 0.28 nM at CB2 and 52.3 nM at the CB1 receptor, giving it around 180 times selectivity for CB2. The 2-methyl and 6-nitro groups on the indole ring both tend to increase CB2 affinity while generally reducing affinity at CB1, explaining the high CB2 selectivity of AM-1221. However, despite this relatively high selectivity for CB2, its CB1 affinity is still too strong to make it useful as a truly selective CB2 agonist, so the related compound AM-1241 is generally preferred for research purposes.

In the United States, all CB1 receptor agonists of the 3-(1-naphthoyl)indole class such as AM-1221 are Schedule I Controlled Substances.

Legal status 
It is illegal to supply, trade, sell, distribute, import or transport the pharmaceutical drug in the UK under the Psychoactive Substances Act 2016 which 
was inforce on May 26th 2016.

See also
 AM-630
 AM-1220
 AM-1235
 AM-2233
 UR-144
 MN-25

References 

Naphthoylindoles
AM cannabinoids
Aminoalkylindoles
Nitrobenzenes
Piperidines
Designer drugs
CB1 receptor agonists
CB2 receptor agonists